Basel I is the first Basel Accord. It arose from deliberations by central bankers from major countries during the late 1970s and 1980s. In 1988, the Basel Committee on Banking Supervision (BCBS) in Basel, Switzerland, published a set of minimum capital requirements for banks. It is also known as the 1988 Basel Accord, and was enforced by law in the Group of Ten (G-10) countries in 1992.

Background

The Committee was formed in response to the messy liquidation of Cologne-based Herstatt Bank in 1974.
On 26 June 1974 a number of banks had released Deutschmarks (the German currency) to the Herstatt Bank in exchange for dollar payments deliverable in New York City. Due to differences in the time zones, there was a lag in the dollar payment to the counterparty banks; during this lag period, before the dollar payments could be effected in New York, the Herstatt Bank was liquidated by German regulators.

This incident prompted the G-10 nations to form the Basel Committee on Banking Supervision in late 1974, under the auspices of the Bank for International Settlements (BIS) located in Basel, Switzerland.

Main framework

Basel I, that is, the 1988 Basel Accord, is primarily focused on credit risk and appropriate risk-weighting of assets. Assets of banks were classified and grouped in five categories according to credit risk, carrying risk weights of 0% (for example cash, bullion, home country debt like Treasuries), 20% (securitisations such as mortgage-backed securities (MBS) with the highest AAA rating), 50% (municipal revenue bonds, residential mortgages), 100% (for example, most corporate debt), and some assets given no rating. Banks with an international presence are required to hold capital equal to 8% of their risk-weighted assets (RWA). 

The tier 1 capital ratio = tier 1 capital / all RWA

The total capital ratio = (tier 1 + tier 2 capital) / all RWA

Leverage ratio = total capital/average total assets

Banks are also required to report off-balance-sheet items such as letters of credit, unused commitments, and derivatives. These all factor into the risk weighted assets, which are reported to regulators. In the United States, the report is typically submitted to the Federal Reserve Bank as HC-R for the bank-holding company and submitted to the Office of the Comptroller of the Currency (OCC) as RC-R for just the bank.

From 1988 this framework was progressively introduced in member countries of G-10, comprising 13 countries : Belgium, Canada, France, Germany, Italy, Japan, Luxembourg, Netherlands, Spain, Sweden, Switzerland, United Kingdom and the United States.

Over 100 other countries also adopted, at least in name, the principles prescribed under Basel I. The efficacy with which the principles are enforced varies, even within nations of the Group.

Criticism 

Basel I incentivized global banks to lend to members of the OECD and the IMF's General Arrangements to Borrow (GAB) while disincentivizing loans to non-members of these institutions.

See also 

 Basel Accords
 Basel IA
 Basel II
 Basel III

References

Further reading

External links 
Bank for International Settlements
Original text of the Basle Capital Accord
1988 in Switzerland
Financial regulation
Bank regulation
1988 in economics